Shashkov and Shashkova are masculine and feminine forms of a common Russian surname. Notable people with the surname include:

Sergei Shashkov (b. 1972), a Russian football player.
Zosima Shashkov (1905—1984), a Russian Soviet minister.

See also
Zosima Shashkov (ship)

Russian-language surnames